Kota Kinabalu International Airport (KKIA)  is an international airport in Kota Kinabalu, the state capital of Sabah, Malaysia. In 2019, over 9 million passengers passed through the airport, making it the second busiest airport in Malaysia after Kuala Lumpur International Airport and the busiest airport in Borneo island. A medium-sized airport with good connections to most major aviation hubs across the Asia-Pacific region, the airport serves the city of Kota Kinabalu as well as the entire west coast of Sabah.

History

The airport began as a military airfield built by the Imperial Japanese Army during World War II. It was then known as Jesselton Airfield (Kota Kinabalu was known as Jesselton at the time). Towards the end of the war, it suffered severe bombings by Allied Forces. After the war, the Department of Civil Aviation (DCA) of North Borneo (now Sabah) took over the operation and maintenance of the airport.

Regular passenger service commenced in May 1949, with a weekly Malayan Airways flight from Singapore, via Kuching and Labuan; the route was extended to Sandakan in September 1949. By 1950, the airport served as a stopover for a biweekly flights between Hong Kong and Labuan, via Manila and Sandakan operated by Cathay Pacific. The domestic air service was further developed by Sabah Airways Limited (later known as Borneo Airways) in 1953, connecting the town to Sandakan, Kudat, Ranau, Keningau and Tawau.

By 1957, the original grass strip runway was resurfaced with bitumen material and a new terminal was built. In 1959, the runway had been extended to 1,593 metres to enable the operation of Malayan Airways' turboprop Viscount aircraft.

By 1963, the runway was further reinforced and lengthened to 1,921 meters to cater for Malaysian Airways Comet 4 jet operations. Commercial flights and passenger arrivals gradually increased and a larger terminal building was needed. By 1967, Cathay Pacific Airways operated a twice-weekly Convair 880 jet service between the airport and Hong Kong with an intermediate stop in Manila.

In 1969, a British consultancy firm was appointed to formulate a Master Plan for a phased and organised development of KKIA over the next few decades. The master plan was submitted to the government with recommendations to:
 reinforce and extend the runway to 2,987 metres to cater for Boeing 707 and 747 jet operations
 build a new terminal complex and parallel taxiway connecting to the runway
 provide navigation equipment, communication facilities and a modern light system for the runway

In the 1970s and 1980s, a new terminal building was built on the other side of the runway from the original terminal. Almost all commercial flights were shifted to this newer and larger terminal. Subsequently, the original terminal became known as the Airport Lama ("Old Airport"). In 1992, the DCA of Sabah was corporatised and Malaysia Airports Holdings Berhad took over the management and operations of the airport. A further expansion project for both terminals began in 2006, and in January 2007 the original terminal was rebranded Terminal 2 whilst the newer terminal became known as Terminal 1.

As a major economic and leisure hub in Malaysian Borneo, past operators at the airport include Air Macau, Airphil Express, Asiana Airlines, Australian Airlines, Cathay Dragon, Cathay Pacific, China Northern Airlines, China Southern Airlines, Dragonair, Far Eastern Air Transport, Fly Asian Xpress, HK Express, Indonesia AirAsia, Korean Air, Lucky Air, Mandarin Airlines, Philippine Airlines, Jetstar Asia Airways, Shanghai Airlines, Shenzhen Airlines, SilkAir, Singapore Airlines, South East Asian Airlines, South Phoenix Airways, Thai AirAsia, Thai Airways International, Thai Smile, Tiger Airways, TransAsia Airways, Uni Air, Vladivostok Air, Wings Air and Xiamen Airlines.

Terminal 2 was closed on 1 December 2015 and all airlines shifted their operations to Terminal 1. There are plans to use Terminal 2 for cargo operations and general aviation.

Expansion and renovation
In mid-2005, the Malaysian federal government approved major renovation and refurbishment works to the main terminal (Terminal 1) as well as a runway expansion project worth RM1.4 billion. Terminal 1 can accommodate four Boeing 747s, one Airbus A330, seven Boeing 737s, three Fokker 50s and three Dorniers at any given time. It has 12 jetways for passenger use. The air traffic control tower, which had hitherto been attached to Terminal 1, was demolished and replaced by a stand-alone tower. Due to delays in upgrade works and disputes between the Department of Civil Aviation of Malaysia and the contractor responsible for the project, the runway extension and upgrading of the ILS (Instrument Landing System) was delayed to Q1 2014.

As a result of this expansion, the airport is now able to accommodate the world's largest passenger aircraft, the Airbus A380. It has also become the second largest airport in Malaysia, with an annual capacity of 12 million passengers – 9 million for Terminal 1 and 3 million for Terminal 2.

Generally, flights operating into and out of KKIA are serviced by narrow-body aircraft. However, during school holiday seasons, airlines such as Malaysia Airlines may upgrade their flights to wide-body aircraft, particularly the Airbus A330-300. Additionally, KKIA was the first airport in Malaysia to welcome the Boeing 787 Dreamliner, operated by Royal Brunei during several product introductory flights in November 2013. As to date, the largest aircraft to have utilize the airport are the Boeing 747-8, B777-300ER and Airbus A350 XWB.

Terminals

Terminal 1
Terminal 1 is the newer and the main terminal of KKIA. It can be accessed via Jalan Kepayan, Jalan Lintas and Jalan Putatan located in the suburb or township of Kepayan. The terminal is capable of handling 9 million passengers per annum and is equipped with the following facilities:
 64 check-in counters for international and domestic flights
 2 baggage x-ray check-in machines and 5 hand luggage x-ray machines (3 for departures, 1 for VIPs and 1 for staff)
 36 immigration counters (16 for departures and 20 for arrivals)
 6 baggage carousels
 5 floors (First floor: arrival hall, second floor: airline offices and inter-state departures, third floor: check-in counters and domestic/foreign departures, fourth floor: Malaysia Airports office, fifth floor: Malaysia Airports administration office)
 12 aerobridges (to provide jetway facilities for landing arrangements of either 5 widebody aircraft along with 2 narrowbody aircraft or 12 narrowbody aicraft)
 22 aircraft parking bays capable of accommodating wide-body, narrow-body and turboprop aircraft 
 1,400 car parking bays

The Departure Hall column head design is inspired by the 'Wakid' basket design. A 'Wakid' is, in Sabahan tradition, a symbol of preparing for a meaningful journey. Some ethnic patterns of the Rungus and Bajau ethnic groups are also incorporated into the design of the floor tiles.

The first flight to depart at the new wing was MH2637 to Kuala Lumpur at 06:50 while the last flight at the old wing was at 00:25. Malaysia Airlines is the main operating airline in this terminal.

Prior to the COVID-19 pandemic, KKIA experienced issues during peak periods where aircraft parking is limited. A temporary workaround by Malaysian Airports was the introduction of a few new aircraft remote bays situated beside the MASkargo hangar. The remote bay allows either 3 additional narrowbody aircraft or 1 widebody and 1 narrowbody aircraft at any given time. Also introduced was the revision on current turboprop aircraft to narrowbody jet parking to allow more B737/A320 aircraft. The remote bay construction has been completed on August 2022 which mostly use by freighter airlines.

Terminal 2
Terminal 2 was the original terminal building of the airport when it was first built. It is accessed via Jalan Mat Salleh in Tanjung Aru and is located on the other side of the runway from Terminal 1. Terminal 2 served charter and low-cost carriers, the main airline utilizing the terminal being AirAsia.

In 2006, Terminal 2 underwent a major renovation and extension to accommodate low-cost carriers, reopening on 1 January 2007 in conjunction with Visit Malaysia Year 2007. The works were completed 27 months ahead of schedule. It had 26 check-in counters for domestic and international flights and 9 parking bays capable for narrow-body aircraft as well as 7 luggage x-ray machines, a VIP room and 13 immigration counters. The terminal had the capacity to handle 3 million passengers annually.

However, with limited expansion space and the congestion at Terminal 2, as well as to consolidate all airlines operations in one terminal, airlines at Terminal 2 was ordered to move to Terminal 1. The decision was opposed by AirAsia, and the airline refused to move despite a government directive to do so, missing the deadline five times as of 1 August 2015. The issue was resolved when AirAsia agreed to move to Terminal 1 on 1 December 2015, and Terminal 2 was closed at midnight that day. The terminal will be converted for cargo, charter, VIP flights and general aviation use.

The Terminal currently serves for cargo operators such as Raya Airways and several General Aviation companies such as Weststar and Layang-Layang. Recently, during a state event with many VIP's in attendance, private jets on charter were moved to Terminal 2 to avoid congestion aircraft parking bays on Terminal 1. This includes a Boeing BBJ2 and B747-8i.

Airlines and destinations

Passenger

Cargo

Traffic and statistics

Traffic

Statistics

Accidents and incidents
 6 June 1976 – A chartered Sabah Air aircraft carrying several government ministers crashed in nearby Sembulan upon descending towards the airport, killing 11 passengers including the then-Chief Minister of Sabah Tun Fuad Stephens.
4 September 1991 – A chartered Grumman Gulfstream II aircraft crashed into a hill while on approach to the airport, killing all 12 people on board.

References

External links 

 Kota Kinabalu International Airport at Malaysia Airports Holdings Berhad
 KKIA Kota Kinabalu International Airport at Ministry of Transport (Malaysia)
 
 

Buildings and structures in Kota Kinabalu
Airports in Sabah